Malcolm Lindsay Shepherd  (27 October 1873 – 25 June 1960) was a senior Australian public servant. From 1904 to 1911 he served as the private secretary to four Australian prime ministers, (Alfred Deakin, Chris Watson, George Reid and Andrew Fisher), prior to being appointed as the inaugural Secretary of the Prime Minister's Department (1911–1921). He subsequently served as official secretary of the Commonwealth of Australia in London (1921–1927) and Secretary of the Department of Defence (1927–1937).

References

1873 births
1960 deaths
Australian diplomats
Australian Companions of the Imperial Service Order
Australian Companions of the Order of St Michael and St George
Secretaries of the Australian Department of Defence
Secretaries of the Department of the Prime Minister and Cabinet